36 Persei is a solitary, variable star located 121 light years away from the Sun in the northern constellation of Perseus. It is visible to the naked eye as a dim, yellow-white hued point of light with a baseline apparent visual magnitude of 5.32.

The stellar classification of 36 Persei is F4III, matching an aging giant star that has used up its core hydrogen. This object is used by astronomers as a spectral standard for stars with a similar class. The star is a suspected variable of unknown type, ranging in visual magnitude from 5.29 down to 5.33, and is a source of X-ray emission. The star is 2.2 billion years old with a projected rotational velocity of 28 km/s. It has an estimated 1.5 times the mass of the Sun and has not yet expanded significantly, having 2.3 times the Sun's girth. The star is radiating 8.6 times the luminosity of the Sun from its photosphere at an effective temperature of 6,546

References

F-type giants
Suspected variables
Astronomical X-ray sources

Perseus (constellation)
BD+45 778
Persei, 36
021770
016499
1069